Party Time is a studio album by The Heptones and backing band called The Upsetters, released in January 1977. Along with Junior Murvin's Police and Thieves and Max Romeo's War Ina Babylon, this album can be seen as part of a Black Ark/Lee "Scratch" Perry produced "holy trinity". Highlights include the title track, a Rasta-influenced cover of Bob Dylan's "I Shall Be Released", the menacing "Storm Cloud", and the determined "Road of Life". After years of being out of print, the album was remastered and re-released on Chris Blackwell's Palm Pictures label in 2003.

Track listing

Original LP 
All tracks composed by Leroy Sibbles; except where indicated
"Party Time"
"Crying Over You"
"Now Generation"
"Mr. President"
"Serious Time" (Barry Llewelyn)
"I Shall Be Released" (Bob Dylan)
"Storm Cloud"
"Road of Life"
"Why Must I"
"Sufferer's Time" (Lee "Scratch" Perry)

Personnel
Leroy Sibbles - vocals, bass
David Madden - horn
Keith Sterling - piano
Boris Gardiner - bass
Phill "Fil" Callender - rhythm guitar
Winston Wright - keyboards
Glen DaCosta - horn
Earl Morgan - vocals, guitar
Willie Lindo - lead guitar
Michael "Mikey Boo" Richards - drums
Noel "Scully" Simms - percussion
R. William - phase guitar
Vin Gordon - horn

References
Party Time - The Heptones

The Heptones albums
Island Records albums
1977 albums
Albums produced by Lee "Scratch" Perry